The Bone Stone Graves are a prehistoric cemetery in the southwestern part of the U.S. state of Ohio. Located northwest of the unincorporated community of Oregonia in northwestern Washington Township, Warren County, the cemetery is composed of an uncertain number of graves of individuals from the Fort Ancient culture of Native Americans.

Graves at the site are composed of bodies contained within limestone stone box graves. A cemetery of this type from the Fort Ancient period is very uncommon, making the Stone Graves a valuable archaeological site. Because most Fort Ancient sites include only a single type of burials, rather than both a mound and a cemetery, it is believed that the vicinity of the Stone Graves may have been inhabited by people of two different foci. In the future, more information may be gained from the cemetery, for the site has never been subject to an archaeological excavation.

On July 15, 1974, the Bone Stone Graves were listed on the National Register of Historic Places because of their archaeological value.  The Bone Mound II was listed on the Register on the same day.

References

Archaeological sites in Ohio
Cemeteries in Warren County, Ohio
Cemeteries on the National Register of Historic Places in Ohio
Fort Ancient culture
Archaeological sites on the National Register of Historic Places in Ohio
Geography of Warren County, Ohio
National Register of Historic Places in Warren County, Ohio